The Jinshi Lake (Golden Lion Lake) is a lake in Sanmin District, Kaohsiung, Taiwan.

History
The lake used to be known as Dapi Lake. However, due to its location next to Mount Shi, the lake is called Jinshi Lake.

Geology
The water source of the lake comes from Dingjin Canal at the east side of the freeway and the lake water flows into Port of Kaohsiung through the escape canal and the Love River. The lake covers an area of around 11 hectares. The total area of the land surrounding the lake is around 14 hectares.

Transportation
The lake is accessible by bus from Kaohsiung Arena Station of Kaohsiung MRT.

See also
 Geography of Taiwan
 List of lakes of Taiwan

References

Lakes of Kaohsiung